The 2019 Big West Conference men's basketball tournament was the postseason men's basketball tournament for the Big West Conference of the 2018–19 NCAA Division I men's basketball season. It was held from March 14 through March 16, 2019 at the Honda Center in Anaheim, California. UC Irvine defeated Cal State Fullerton 92–64 in the championship game to win the tournament, and received the conference's automatic bid to the NCAA tournament. The championship was the second for UC Irvine in the Big West, last winning it in 2015.

Seeds
The top eight conference teams were eligible for the tournament. Teams were seeded by record within the conference, with a tiebreaker system to seed teams with identical conference records. Teams were reseeded after the quarterfinals.

Schedule and results

Bracket

References

Big West Conference men's basketball tournament
Tournament
Big West Conference men's basketball tournament
Big West Conference men's basketball tournament